In Islam, bid'ah refers to innovation in religious matters. Linguistically, the term means "innovation, novelty, heretical doctrine, heresy". Despite its common use in Muslim texts, the term is not found in the Qur'an. 

In classical Arabic literature (adab), it has been used as a form of praise for outstanding compositions of prose and poetry.

Traditional view

In early Islamic history, bid'ah referred primarily to heterodox doctrines. In Islamic law, when used without qualification, bid'ah denotes any newly invented matter that is without precedent and is in opposition to the Quran and Sunnah.

Scholars generally have divided bid'ah into two types: innovations in worldly matters and that of in religious matters. Some have additionally divided bid'ah into lawful and unlawful innovations, the details of which are discussed below.

Introducing and acting upon a bid'ah in religious matters is a sin and considered one of the enormities in Islam that is obligatory to immediately desist and repent from.

In worldly matters
Sunni Muslim scholars have divided bid'ah in worldly matters into two types:
 Good worldly innovations such as using technology to propagate the faith of Islam.
 Innovations that are purely evil - these are forbidden under Islamic law. Examples of this type of bid'ah include alcohol, or, in modern times, the discovery and synthesis of new intoxicants.

In religious matters

 "A newly invented way [beliefs or action] in the religion, in imitation of the Shariah (prescribed Law), by which nearness to Allah is sought, [but] not being supported by any authentic proof - neither in its foundations, nor in the manner in which it is performed."
 "Carrying out actions which displease Allah Subhanahu wa ta'ala and his messenger" Muhammad. (Muhammad ibn Isa at-Tirmidhi).
 "New things that have no basis in the Qurʼan or Sunnah" (Ibn Rajab).
 bid'ah is always bad but if a new thing has origins in the Qurʼan and Sunnah it is to be called Bid’ah Logaviyya (verbal innovation), (Ibn Taymiyyah).

Proofs against bid'ah

Ali ibn Abi Talib, of the Rashidun (rightly guided Caliphs), said; "He who innovates or gives protection to an innovator, there is a curse of Allah and that of His angels and that of the whole humanity upon him." Abdullah ibn Umar said: "Every innovation is misguidance, even if the people see it as something good."

Abd Allah ibn Abbas, a companion of the Prophet and early Islamic scholar also said: "Indeed the most detestable of things to Allah are the innovations." Sufyan al-Thawri, a tabi'i Islamic scholar, Hafiz and jurist, mentions: "Innovation is more beloved to Iblees than sin, since a sin may be repented for but innovation is not repented for." He also said, "Whoever listens to an innovator has left the protection of Allāh and is entrusted with the innovation."

A person once sent salaam to Abdullah ibn Umar who replied: "I do not accept his salaam, as this person has innovated by becoming Qadariyah (A sect which does not believe in destiny.")

Al-Fudayl ibn 'Iyad is reputed to have said: "I met the best of people, all of them Salafi and they used to forbid from accompanying the people of innovation." Hasan al-Basri mentions: "Do not sit with the people of innovation and desires, nor argue with them, nor listen to them". Ibraaheem ibn Maysarah mentions: "Whoever honours an innovator has aided in the destruction of Islam."

Al-Hasan ibn 'Ali al-Barbahari mentions: "The innovators are like scorpions. They bury their heads and bodies in the sand and leave their tails out. When they get the chance they sting; the same with the innovators who conceal themselves amongst the people, when they are able, they do what they desire." Abu Haatim said: "A sign of the people of innovation is their battling against the people of Narrations." Abu 'Uthmaan as-Saaboonee said: "The signs of the people of innovation are clear and obvious. The most apparent of their signs is their severe enmity for those who carry the reports of the Prophet."

Various views differentiating good and bad bid'ah 
Jabir ibn Abd Allah narrated "...The Prophet said: He who introduced some good (precedent) practice in Islam which was followed after him (by people) he would be assured of reward like one who followed it, without their rewards being diminished in any respect. And he who introduced some evil practice in Islam which had been followed subsequently (by others), he would be required to bear the burden like that of one who followed this (evil practice) without theirs being diminished in any respect.

Anas ibn Malik said "I heard the Prophet say: 'My nation will not unite on misguidance, so if you see them differing, follow the great majority.'(The grade of the Hadith is Dhaif)"

Abu Hurairah narrated that the Prophet said, "Whoever prayed at night the whole month of Ramadan out of sincere Faith and hoping for a reward from Allah, then all his previous sins will be forgiven." After the Prophet's death the people continued observing that (i.e. Nawafil offered individually, not in congregation), and it remained as it was during the Caliphate of Abu Bakr and in the early days of Umar ibn Al-Khattab's Caliphate. During Ramadan upon seeing people praying in different groups, Umar ordered Ubayy ibn Ka'b to lead the people in congregational prayer. On this Umar said: 'What an excellent Bida (i.e. innovation in religion at that time from an earlier time) this is; but the prayer which they do not perform, but sleep at its time is better than the one they are offering.'

Salman al-Farsi narrated that the Prophet was asked, by some of the companions, about the permissibility and prohibition of certain items, he states "Halal is that which Allah has made Halal in His book, Haram is that which Allah has made Haram in His book and about which he has remained silent is all forgiven."

Abu Hurairah narrated at the time of the Fajr prayer the Prophet asked Bilal ibn al-Harith, "Tell me of the best deed you did after embracing Islam, for I heard your footsteps in front of me in Paradise." Bilal replied, "I did not do anything worth mentioning except that whenever I performed ablution during the day or night, I prayed after that ablution as much as was written for me." Ibn Hajar al-Asqalani says in Fath al-Bari that "the hadith shows it is permissible to use personal reasoning (ijtihad) in choosing times for acts of worship, for Bilal reached the conclusion he mentioned by his own inference and the Prophet (Allah bless him and give him peace) confirmed him therein." Similar to this, Khubayb ibn Adiy asked to pray two rak’as before being executed by idolators in Mecca, and was hence the first to establish the sunna of two rak'as for those who are steadfast in going to their death.

Rifaa ibn Rafi narrated: When we were praying behind the Prophet and he raised his head from bowing and said, "Allah hears whoever praises Him," a man behind him said, "Our Lord, Yours is the praise, abundantly, wholesomely, and blessedly."When he rose to leave, the Prophet asked who said it, and when the man replied that it was he, the Prophet said, "I saw thirty-odd angel each striving to be the one to write it." Ibn Hajar al-Asqalani comments in Fath al-Bari that the hadith "indicates the permissibility of initiation new expression of dhikr in the prayer other than the ones related through hadith texts (even though this is still reported in the hadiths), as long as they do not contradict those conveyed by the hadith. It is clear that this is since the above were a mere enhancement and addendum to the know, sunna dhikr."

Imam Shafi'i gave the following advice, "An innovation which contradicts the Qurʼan, Sunnah, an Athar or Ijma is a heretical bid'a: if however something new is introduced which is not evil in itself and does not contradict the above mentioned authorities of religious life, then it is a praiseworthy, unobjectional bid'a." This can infer worldly bid'a or technology.

Modern discourse 
The criterion that qualifies a particular action as a bid'ah in the religion is a debate amongst Sunni scholars. Scholars affiliated to the Salafi and Wahhabi sects argue for an exclusive, literal definition that entails anything not specifically performed or confirmed by the Prophet.

Practitioners of Sufism, in contrast, argue for an inclusive, holistic definition. Umar Faruq Abd-Allah writes:

In Shia Islam
According to Shia Islam the definition of bidah is anything that is introduced to Islam as either being fard (mandatory), mustahabb (recommended), halal (permissible), makruh (reprehensible) or haram (forbidden) that contradicts the Quran or hadith. Any new good practice introduced that does not contradict the Quran or hadith is permissible. However, it is not permissible to say that a new good practice (that does not contradict the Quran or hadith) is obligatory, highly recommended or "sunnah" proper. Hence, the Shia stance mirrors the body of Sunni scholars who proffer the idea of "bidah hasana". As a general rule in Shia jurisprudence, anything is permissible except whatever is prohibited through divine revelation (i.e. the Quran or hadith).

Mohammad Baqir Majlisi in the definition of heresy says:What is presented after the Prophet as a religious belief or practice, while no specific statement has been made about it and it is not considered as an example of a general rule or that practice is explicitly forbidden. This definition means that innovation must be done in the name of religion to be considered heresy.

Disputes
Despite the general understanding of standing scholarly disagreements (ikhtilaf), the notion of lawful innovation is a polarizing issue in the Islamic world. A practical example of this is the debate over the permissibility of the mawlid or commemoration of Muhammad's birthday. All scholars agree that such celebrations did not exist in the early period of Islamic history, and yet mawalid commemorations are a common element in Muslim societies around the world. Even so, Sunnis' scholars are divided between emphatic unconditional condemnation and conditional acceptance of the celebration with the former insisting it is a bidah and thus automatically unlawful, while the latter argues it nonetheless is contextually permissible.

British historian Sadakat Kadri has noted the change over time in what is considered bidah.

Hadith were not written down until the 9th century, at least in part because "traditionists such as Ibn Hanbal considered human literature to be an unholy innovation." This interpretation changed even for very conservative jurists such as Ibn Taymiyyah who wrote dozens of books. Ibn Taymiyyah however considered mathematics, a bidah, a false form of knowledge that "does not bring perfection to the human soul, nor save man from castigation of God, nor lead him to a happy life", and forbade its use in determining the beginning of lunar months. Very conservative Wahhabis allow the broadcast of television but Indian Deobandi forbid their followers from watching it, but make use of the more recent invention the internet to issue fatwas.

Traditionally who died of plague and who did not was explained as simply the will of God based on al-Bukhari's al-Sahih hadith, but studying the progress of the Black Death (bubonic plague) in the 14th century, scholar Ibn al-Khatib noted those who died had the plague transmitted to them from "garments, vessels, ear-rings; ... persons ... by infection of a healthy sea-port by an arrival from an infected land" where as isolated individuals were immune. In the Muqaddimah, Ibn Khaldun defends the science of medicine from suggestions that it is an innovation going against the Sunna. "The medicine mentioned in religious tradition ... is in no way part of the divine revelation." It was simply part of "Arab custom and happened to be mentioned in connection with the circumstances of the Prophet, like other things that were customary in his generation." But was "not mentioned in order to imply that [it] is stipulated by the religious law."

In his Book of Knowledge Al-Ghazali observed that many phenomena once thought bidah had come to be though legally unobjectionable. 
[A]mong the accepted practices of our time are decorating and furnishing the mosques, and expending great sums of money on their ornate construction and fine rugs which were then considered innovations. These were introduced by the pilgrims, since the early Muslims seldom placed anything on the ground during prayer. Similarly disputation and debate are among the most honoured disciples of the day and are numbered among the best meritorious works (qarubat): nevertheless they were among the taboos at the time of the Companions. The same is true of the chanting (talhiri) of the Quran and the call for prayer, going to excess in matters of cleanliness and being over fastidious in matters of ceremonial purity, ruling clothes unclean on petty and far-fetched grounds, and, at the same time, being lax in ruling foods lawful and unlawful as well as many other like things.
He quoted Hudhayfah ibn al-Yaman approvingly: "Strange as it may seem, accepted practices of today are the taboos of a day gone by. ... And the taboos of today are the accepted practices of a day yet to come."

See also
 Ghulat
 Glossary of Islam
 Index of Islam-related articles
 Outline of Islam
 Ikhtilaf
 Verse of Obedience
 Uli al-amr

References

Further reading
Keller, Nuh Ha Mim. (1995). The Concept of Bida in the Islamic Sharia. Muslim Academy Trust. .
Abdullah, 'Umar Faruq, "Heaven", in Muhammad in History, Thought, and Culture: An Encyclopedia of the Prophet of God (2 vols.), Edited by C. Fitzpatrick and A. Walker, Santa Barbara, ABC-CLIO, 2014, Vol I, pp. 251–254.

External links

Sunni view
The Perfection of the Sharia and an Exposition of the Reprehensible Innovations That Have Crept Into Islam
Innovation in Light of the Perfection of the Shari'ah
Shaykh Uthaymeen on innovations(redirects to survey)
Expounding Bidah
Bidah: a Detailed Explanation from Living Islam
Innovation and Creativity in Islam by Dr. Umar Fard Abd-Allah (404)

Shia view
Introduction to Bidah from the Shia website Answering Ansar (password restricted)
Detailed Explanation of the Shia view on Bidah (password restricted)

Arabic words and phrases in Sharia
Heresy
Islamic terminology